The 2017 London Marathon was the 37th running of the annual marathon race in London, England, which took place on Sunday, 23 April. Mary Jepkosgei Keitany won the women's race, setting a new women-only marathon world record with a time of 2:17:01, while Daniel Wanjiru came first in the men's race in 2:05:48. David Weir claimed a record breaking seventh win at the London Marathon in the men's wheelchair event. The win broke a tie between Weir and Tanni Gray Thompson for the most wins at the London Marathon.
 	 	
Around 253,930 people applied to enter the race: 53,229 had their applications accepted and 40,048 started the race. These were all record highs for the race. A total of 39,406 runners, 23,912 men and 15,494 women, finished the race.

In the under-17 Mini Marathon, the 3-mile able-bodied and wheelchair events were won by Toby Osman (14:25), Erin Wallace (16:09), Jack Agnew (11:39) and Kare Adenegan (12:51).

Course
The London Marathon is run over a largely flat course around the River Thames, and spans 26 miles and 385 yards (42.195 kilometres). The route has markers at one mile and five kilometre intervals.

The course begins at three separate points: the 'red start' in southern Greenwich Park on Charlton Way, the 'green start' in St John's Park, and the 'blue start' on Shooter's Hill Road. The three courses converge after  in Woolwich, close to the Royal Artillery Barracks.

Heading next into Deptford and Surrey Quays in the Docklands, and out towards Bermondsey, competitors race along Jamaica Road before reaching the half-way point as they cross Tower Bridge. Running east again along The Highway through Wapping, competitors head up towards Limehouse and into Mudchute in the Isle of Dogs via Westferry Road, before heading into Canary Wharf.

As the route leads away from Canary Wharf into Poplar, competitors run west down Poplar High Street back towards Limehouse and on through Commercial Road. They then move back onto The Highway, onto Lower and Upper Thames Streets. Heading into the final leg of the race, competitors pass The Tower of London on Tower Hill. In the penultimate mile along The Embankment, the London Eye comes into view, before the athletes turn right into Birdcage Walk to complete the final , catching the sights of Big Ben and Buckingham Palace, and finishing in The Mall alongside St. James's Palace.

Race summary

In the women's race, Keitany was rarely threatened. She broke away from the field after the first mile and maintained a comfortable lead until the end of the race. Her final time was the second fastest in history, and the fastest set without the help of male pacemakers, beating Paula Radcliffe's record of 2:17:42 set in the 2005 race. The overall women's record, 2:15:25, was also set by Radcliffe in the 2003 race.

The men's race was largely contested between Kenya's Wanjiru and Ethiopia's Kenenisa Bekele. Bekele led until approximately halfway through the race, when he dropped back sharply. Wanjiru stayed with a lead pack of Bedan Karoki, Abel Kirui and Feyisa Lilesa until 21 miles before making a break. However, Bekele was not finished and rapidly accelerated through the field, closing the gap to eight seconds with less than a mile left. Wanjiru however found the strength to hold Bekele off, eventually winning by nine seconds.

There was also a surprise when a club runner, Josh Griffiths, who did not start with the elite athletes, finished in 2:14:49, a time which would have given him 13th place in the elite field. He qualified for the World Championships with this time. Matthew Rees helped an exhausted fellow runner, David Wyeth, across the finish line, an occurrence widely mentioned in social and traditional media.

The men's wheelchair race saw David Weir claim a record breaking seventh win at the London Marathon when he out sprinted Marcel Hug and Rafael Botello. Manuela Schär won her first title in London, finishing almost 5 minutes ahead of her nearest rival.

Results

Men

Women

Wheelchair men

Wheelchair women

References

Results
Virgin Money London Marathon 2017 Tracking and Results. London Marathon. Retrieved 2020-05-03.
Men Results. Association of Road Racing Statisticians. Retrieved 2020-05-03.
Women Results. Association of Road Racing Statisticians. Retrieved 2020-05-03.

External links 

2017
London Marathon
London Marathon
April 2017 sports events in the United Kingdom